Stiphodon tuivi is a species of goby found on the Marquesan Islands in French Polynesia.
  
This species can reach a length of  SL.

References

tuivi
Taxa named by Ronald E. Watson
Fish described in 1995